Floating lantern may refer to:
Sky lantern, a small hot air balloon made of paper that floats in the air
Water lantern,  a type of lamp that floats on the surface of the water